Feces (or faeces), known colloquially and in slang as poo, caca, scat and poop, are the solid or semi-solid remains of food that was not digested in the small intestine, and has been broken down by bacteria in the large intestine. Feces contain a relatively small amount of metabolic waste products such as bacterially altered bilirubin, and dead epithelial cells from the lining of the gut.

Feces are discharged through the anus or cloaca during defecation.

Feces can be used as fertilizer or soil conditioner in agriculture. They can also be burned as fuel or dried and used for construction. Some medicinal uses have been found. In the case of human feces, fecal transplants or fecal bacteriotherapy are in use. Urine and feces together are called excreta.

Characteristics
The distinctive odor of feces is due to skatole, and thiols (sulfur-containing compounds), as well as amines and carboxylic acids. Skatole is produced from tryptophan via indoleacetic acid. Decarboxylation gives skatole.

The perceived bad odor of feces has been hypothesized to be a deterrent for humans, as consuming or touching it may result in sickness or infection.

Physiology

Feces are discharged through the anus or cloaca during defecation. The forces required to expel the feces are generated through muscular contractions and a build-up of gases inside the gut, prompting the sphincter to relieve the pressure and to release the feces.

Ecology
After an animal has digested eaten material, the remains of that material are discharged from its body as waste. Although it is lower in energy than the food from which it is derived, feces may retain a large amount of energy, often 50% of that of the original food. This means that of all food eaten, a significant amount of energy remains for the decomposers of ecosystems. Many organisms feed on feces, from bacteria to fungi to insects such as dung beetles, who can sense odors from long distances. Some may specialize in feces, while others may eat other foods. Feces serve not only as a basic food, but also as a supplement to the usual diet of some animals. This process is known as coprophagia, and occurs in various animal species such as young elephants eating the feces of their mothers to gain essential gut flora, or by other animals such as dogs, rabbits, and monkeys.

Feces and urine, which reflect ultraviolet light, are important to raptors such as kestrels, who can see the near ultraviolet and thus find their prey by their middens and territorial markers.

Seeds also may be found in feces. Animals who eat fruit are known as frugivores. An advantage for a plant in having fruit is that animals will eat the fruit and unknowingly disperse the seed in doing so. This mode of seed dispersal is highly successful, as seeds dispersed around the base of a plant are unlikely to succeed and often are subject to heavy predation. Provided the seed can withstand the pathway through the digestive system, it is not only likely to be far away from the parent plant, but is even provided with its own fertilizer.

Organisms that subsist on dead organic matter or detritus are known as detritivores, and play an important role in ecosystems by recycling organic matter back into a simpler form that plants and other autotrophs may absorb once again. This cycling of matter is known as the biogeochemical cycle. To maintain nutrients in soil it is therefore important that feces returns to the area from which they came, which is not always the case in human society where food may be transported from rural areas to urban populations and then feces disposed of into a river or sea.

Human feces

Depending on the individual and the circumstances, human beings may defecate several times a day, every day, or once every two or three days. Extensive hardening of the feces that interrupts this routine for several days or more is called constipation.

The appearance of human fecal matter varies according to diet and health. Normally it is semisolid, with a mucus coating. A combination of bile and bilirubin, which comes from dead red blood cells, gives feces the typical brown color.

After the meconium, the first stool expelled, a newborn's feces contains only bile, which gives it a yellow-green color. Breast feeding babies expel soft, pale yellowish, and not quite malodorous matter; but once the baby begins to eat, and the body starts expelling bilirubin from dead red blood cells, its matter acquires the familiar brown color.

At different times in their life, human beings will expel feces of different colors and textures.  A stool that passes rapidly through the intestines will look greenish; lack of bilirubin will make the stool look like clay.

Uses of animal feces

Fertilizer
The feces of animals, e.g. guano and manure often are used as fertilizer.

Energy 

Dry animal dung, such as that of camel, bison and cattle, is burned as fuel many countries.

Animals such as the giant panda and zebra possess gut bacteria capable of producing biofuel. The bacterium in question, Brocadia anammoxidans, can be used to synthesize the rocket fuel hydrazine.

Coprolites and paleofeces 

A coprolite is fossilized feces and is classified as a trace fossil. In paleontology they give evidence about the diet of an animal. They were first described by William Buckland in 1829. Prior to this, they were known as "fossil fir cones" and "bezoar stones". They serve a valuable purpose in paleontology because they provide direct evidence of the predation and diet of extinct organisms. Coprolites may range in size from a few millimetres to more than 60 centimetres.

Palaeofeces are ancient feces, often found as part of archaeological excavations or surveys. Intact paleofeces of ancient people may be found in caves in arid climates and in other locations with suitable preservation conditions. These are studied to determine the diet and health of the people who produced them through the analysis of seeds, small bones, and parasite eggs found inside. Feces may contain information about the person excreting the material as well as information about the material. They also may be analyzed chemically for more in-depth information on the individual who excreted them, using lipid analysis and ancient DNA analysis. The success rate of usable DNA extraction is relatively high in paleofeces, making it more reliable than skeletal DNA retrieval.
  
The reason this analysis is possible at all is due to the digestive system not being entirely efficient, in the sense that not everything that passes through the digestive system is destroyed. Not all of the surviving material is recognizable, but some of it is. Generally, this material is the best indicator archaeologists can use to determine ancient diets, as no other part of the archaeological record is so direct an indicator.

A process that preserves feces in a way that they may be analyzed later is the Maillard reaction. This reaction creates a casing of sugar that preserves the feces from the elements. To extract and analyze the information contained within, researchers generally have to freeze the feces and grind it up into powder for analysis.

Other uses

Animal dung occasionally is used as a cement to make adobe mudbrick huts, or even in throwing sports, especially with cow and camel dung.

Kopi luwak (pronounced ), or "civet coffee", is coffee made from coffee berries that have been eaten by and passed through the digestive tract of the Asian palm civet (Paradoxurus hermaphroditus). Giant pandas provide fertilizer for the world's most expensive green tea. In Malaysia, tea is made from the droppings of stick insects fed on guava leaves.

In northern Thailand, elephants are used to digest coffee beans in order to make Black Ivory coffee, which is among the world's most expensive coffees. Paper is also made from elephant dung in Thailand. Haathi Chaap is a brand of paper made from elephant dung.

Dog feces was used in the tanning process of leather during the Victorian era. Collected dog feces, known as "pure", "puer", or "pewer", was mixed with water to form a substance known as "bate", because proteolytic enzymes in the dog feces helped to relax the fibrous structure of the hide before the final stages of tanning. Dog feces collectors were known as pure finders.

Elephants, hippos, koalas and pandas are born with sterile intestines, and require bacteria obtained from eating the feces of their mothers to digest vegetation.

In India, cow dung and cow urine are major ingredients of the traditional Hindu drink Panchagavya. Politician Shankarbhai Vegad stated that they can cure cancer.

In the Middle East, cow dung is consumed for a variety of reasons, such as curing dysentery, a belief of healing properties or as a food staple.

Terminology 

Feces is the scientific terminology, while the term stool is also commonly used in medical contexts. Outside of scientific contexts, these terms are less common, with the most common layman's term being "poop" or "poo". The term shit is also in common use, although is widely considered vulgar or offensive. There are many other terms, see below.

Etymology 
The word faeces is the plural of the Latin word faex meaning "dregs". In most English-language usage, there is no singular form, making the word a plurale tantum; out of various major dictionaries, only one enters variation from plural agreement.

Synonyms

"Feces" is used more in biology and medicine than in other fields (reflecting science's tradition of classical Latin and New Latin)
In hunting and tracking, terms such as dung, scat, spoor, and droppings normally are used to refer to non-human animal feces
In husbandry and farming, manure is common.
Stool is a common term in reference to human feces. For example, in medicine, to diagnose the presence or absence of a medical condition, a stool sample sometimes is requested for testing purposes.
The term bowel movement(s) (with each movement a defecation event) is also common in health care.

There are many synonyms in informal registers for feces, just like there are for urine. Many are euphemismistic, colloquial, or both; some are profane (such as shit), whereas most belong chiefly to child-directed speech (such as poo or the palindromic word poop) or to crude humor (such as crap, dump, load and turd.).

Feces of animals 
The feces of animals often has special names (some of them are slang), for example:
Non-human animals
As bulk material – dung
Individually – droppings
Cattle
Bulk material – cow dung
Individual droppings – cow pats, meadow muffins, etc.
Deer (and formerly other quarry animals) – fewmets
 Wild carnivores – scat 
Otter – spraint
Birds (individual) – droppings (also include urine as white crystals of uric acid)
Seabirds or bats (large accumulations) – guano
Herbivorous insects, such as caterpillars and leaf beetles – frass
Earthworms, lugworms etc. – worm castings (feces extruded at ground surface)
Feces when used as fertilizer (usually mixed with animal bedding and urine) – manure
Horses – horse manure, roadapple (before motor vehicles became common, horse droppings were a big part of the rubbish communities needed to clean off roads)

Society and culture

Feelings of disgust

In all human cultures, feces elicits varying degrees of disgust in adults. Children under two years typically have no disgust response to it, suggesting it is culturally derived. Disgust toward feces appears to be strongest in cultures where flush toilets make olfactory contact with human feces minimal. Disgust is experienced primarily in relation to the sense of taste (either perceived or imagined) and, secondarily to anything that causes a similar feeling by sense of smell, touch, or vision.

Social media 

Jokes 
Poop is the center of toilet humor, and is commonly in interest of young children and teenagers.

Gallery

See also 

 Coprophagia
 Coprophilia
 Coprophilous fungi
 Cow dung
 Excretory system
 Fecal plug
 Jenkem
 Manure
 Metabolic waste
 Night soil
 Sanitation
 Scatology
 Whale feces
 Zooplankton fecal pellets

References

External links

 MedFriendly's Article on Feces

 
Animal physiology